Abajaluy-e Olya (also Romanized as Abājalūy-e ‘Olyā; also known as Abājalū-ye ‘Olyā) is a village in Nazlu-e Shomali Rural District, Nazlu District, Urmia County, West Azerbaijan Province, Iran. At the 2006 census, its population was 250, in 68 families.

References 

Populated places in Urmia County